Tabernaemontana salomonensis is a species of plant in the family Apocynaceae. It is found in the Solomon Islands.

References

salomonensis